Investing.com is a financial platform and news website; one of the top three global financial websites in the world. It offers market quotes, information about stocks, futures, options, analysis, commodities, and an economic calendar.

History
Founded in 2007 as Forexpros, the portal offered forex analysis, a broker directory, and a discussion forum in English, Spanish, Hebrew and Arabic. During 2008–2009, more editions were added and the platform expanded its offering from Forex data to encompass other financial instruments.

The company purchased their current domain, Investing.com, for $2.45 million at the end of 2012 in one of the most expensive domain deals in history.

Investing.com's Android app was launched in September 2013, while an iOS version of the app was launched a year later. Over time, it added additional localized editions and services.

In February 2021, it was ranked as the 194th most popular website in the world according to Alexa. It has four offices worldwide and 300 employees (as of 2019), and is composed of 33 editions in 24 languages.

In April 2021, Globes reported the sale of the company for 500 million dollars.

Investing.com has launched a platform InvestingPro which provides exclusive data, professional tools, custom charts, professional-grade. It is ad-free and can access up to 1000+ fundamental & technical metrics.

References

Financial services companies established in 2007
Financial news agencies
Financial data vendors
Multilingual news services
Economics websites
Spanish news websites
Internet properties established in 2007
News agencies based in Spain
Spanish companies established in 2007